Douglas White may refer to:
 Douglas White (jurist) (born 1945), New Zealand jurist
 Douglas R. White (born 1942), American social anthropologist

See also
 Doug White (disambiguation)